Artichoke Creek is a stream in Swift County, in the U.S. state of Minnesota.

Artichoke Creek was named for the Jerusalem artichokes harvested by Ojibwe Indians as a food source.

See also
List of rivers of Minnesota

References

Rivers of Swift County, Minnesota
Rivers of Minnesota